"Like Dat" is the debut single by rapper Stat Quo, released in 2005. It was originally intended to be the debut single for his long-awaited debut album, Statlanta but after the album was reworked three times the original version of the album was scrapped. It was later released for the soundtracks to NBA Live '06 and Midnight Club 3: Remix Soundtrack. It was also featured on the Trill-N-True Certified and The Bottom mixtapes on iTunes. It peaked at #35 on Billboard magazine's Hot R&B/Hip-Hop Singles Sales component chart.

Music video

The music video was filmed and produced in Atlanta, Georgia, the video includes cameos from Ludacris, Young Buck and Bun B of UGK.

Charts
Billboard Hot R&B/Hip-Hop Singles Sales=35

2005 singles
American hip hop songs
Song recordings produced by Eminem
Song recordings produced by Dr. Dre
Shady Records singles
Aftermath Entertainment singles
Interscope Records singles
Songs written by Eminem
Songs written by Dr. Dre
2005 songs